Dalton Smith (born 8 February 1997) is an English professional boxer who has held the British super-lightweight title since 2022. As an amateur he won a silver medal at the 2014 European Youth Championships and bronze at the 2015 Commonwealth Youth Games, both in the lightweight division, and won the 2018 ABA Championships at light-welterweight.

Amateur career 
As an amateur Smith won multiple national titles at the junior and senior level, including the 2018 ABA Championships at light-welterweight. At the international level he won a silver medal at the 2014 European Youth Championships and bronze at the 2015 Commonwealth Youth Games, both in the lightweight division. He also competed at the 2013 World Junior Championships, reaching the quarter-finals;  the 2014 World Youth Championships, losing in the round of 8; and the 2016, 2017 and 2018 World Series of Boxing as part of the British Lionhearts.

Professional career
After deciding to forgo the 2020 Olympics – due to rule changes regarding weight categories, along with several injuries suffered throughout his amateur career – Smith signed a promotional contract with Eddie Hearn's Matchroom Boxing in May 2019, making his professional debut two months later on 10 May, scoring a four-round points decision (PTS) victory over Luka Leskovic at the Motorpoint Arena in Nottingham.

In his next fight he defeated Ibrar Riyaz with a second-round stoppage via corner retirement (RTD) on 21 July as part of the undercard for Dillian Whyte vs. Oscar Rivas. Smith became only the fourth man to stop Riyaz, a career journeyman who at the time had a record of 6–165–4. Three months later he travelled to Italy, defeating Marko Radenovic via third-round technical knockout (TKO) before ending the year with a third-round TKO win against Michael Carrero in November.

His first fight of 2020 came against Benson Nyilawila in March, winning by fourth-round TKO in a bout that was streamed live on Facebook.

Professional boxing record

References

Living people
1997 births
English male boxers
Sportspeople from Sheffield
Light-welterweight boxers